Gu Junjie (born 5 May 1985 in Sichuan) is a Chinese triple jumper. His personal best jump is 17.23 metres, achieved in September 2004 in Hefei.

He finished fourth at the 2000 World Junior Championships, won the gold medal at the 2003 Summer Universiade, the silver medal at the 2003 Asian Championships and another gold at the 2005 Asian Championships. He also competed at the 2007 World Championships and the 2008 World Indoor Championships without reaching the final.

Competition record

References 

1985 births
Living people
Chinese male triple jumpers
Olympic athletes of China
Athletes (track and field) at the 2008 Summer Olympics
Athletes from Sichuan
Universiade medalists in athletics (track and field)
Universiade gold medalists for China
Medalists at the 2003 Summer Universiade